Peter F. Romero previously served as the United States Ambassador to Ecuador and as Assistant Secretary of State for Western Hemisphere Affairs.  He was confirmed by the U.S. Senate and was appointed by President Bill Clinton in the Fall of 1993.

Romero previously spent 24 years in the United States Department of State. He received both his bachelor's and master's degrees in international relations from Florida State University.

References

External links
 Official Bio
 Background Info
 

Living people
Ambassadors of the United States to Ecuador
United States Assistant Secretaries of State
Florida State University alumni
Year of birth missing (living people)